Jesper Bøge Pedersen (born 22 February 1990) is a Danish professional footballer who plays as a right-back for Danish 1st Division club Hobro IK.

Club career

Early career
In the school year 2005–06, Bøge attended sports school in Ikast (ISI). During that time, he played football in the academy of local Danish Superliga club FC Midtjylland, but when the school year ended, he returned to his hometown, Bogense, while his career continued in the youth of OB. However, it became a short visit to Bogense, and he returned to the academy of FC Midtjylland in December 2007.

Midtjylland
Bøge was part of the Midtjylland academy for some years, and signed a three-year contract extension in 2009. Midtjylland's reserve team, Ikast fS experienced some issues during their 2008–09 campaign, and in the summer of 2009, Bøge and two other teammates were promoted to the squad. However, he made his debut for Midtjylland on 6 December 2009 against FC Nordsjælland, where he replaced Jonas Borring in the 76th minute; his only appearance during the season. However, a month later, he signed a new contract and was permanently promoted to the first team squad.

In August 2011, Bøge suffered a groin injury and was out for three months. He returned in October, but suffered another injured in January 2012. Bøge did not make an appearance during the season, and afterwards stated that he was interested in being loaned out, due to a lack of playing time.

FC Fyn
On 3 August 2012, Bøge signed with Danish 1st Division side FC Fyn. He quickly became a key player for the team and was soon linked to a number of clubs. FC Fyn went bankrupt in January 2013, effectively making Bøge a free agent. He practiced at nearby division club Næsby Boldklub for a while, before being signed by Hobro IK.

Hobro
In March 2013, Bøge signed a one-and-a-half-year contract with Danish 1st Division club Hobro IK. He made his debut on 28 March against HB Køge, a match which Hobro won 1–0.

Bøge quickly became an important player for the team and extended his contract for two years, after a successful 2013–14 season with 32 league appearances, as Hobro won promotion to the Danish Superliga for the first time in club history. After Hobro suffered relegation to the 1st Division again after the 2015–16 season, Bøge helped the team to bounce back to promotion in the following season, where Hobro won the league.

Honours

Hobro
1st Division: 2016–17

References

External links
 Guardian Football
 

Living people
1990 births
Association football fullbacks
Danish men's footballers
FC Midtjylland players
Hobro IK players
Danish Superliga players
People from Nordfyn Municipality
Danish 1st Division players
Næsby Boldklub players
Odense Boldklub players
Ikast FS players
FC Fyn players
Denmark youth international footballers
Sportspeople from the Region of Southern Denmark